The United States Wrestling Association (USWA) was a professional wrestling promotion based in Memphis, Tennessee. The company was founded when the Memphis-based Continental Wrestling Association merged with the Dallas-based World Class Wrestling Association.

History

Foundation
The USWA was founded as an attempt to create a fourth national promotion, alongside Jim Crockett Promotions/WCW, AWA and the WWF (now known as WWE). The USWA was created through a merger of the WCCW (from Texas) and the CWA (based in Memphis, Tennessee). It originally promoted shows, usually headlined by Jerry Lawler, in both Tennessee and Texas.

WCCW withdraws
The Dallas promotion (formerly WCCW), which was 40 percent owned by the Von Erich family, withdrew from the USWA in September 1990 due to a revenue dispute. According to Skandor Akbar, there were lawsuits involved, most notably when Jerry Jarrett was sued by Kevin Von Erich. That promotion reverted to the World Class name, but ceased operations two months later due to lack of revenue.

Jerry Jarrett and Jerry Lawler brought the USWA back to Texas, but only on a limited basis, while promoters Joe Pedicino, Max Andrews, and Boni Blackstone were getting the new Global Wrestling Federation ready for a spring 1991 debut at the Sportatorium. Several of the former World Class and USWA Dallas wrestlers joined the new GWF, while others from the old CWA remained with the USWA.

Talent exchange with the WWF
In 1992, the USWA began a talent exchange with the WWF, which saw Lawler sign on to Vince McMahon's federation, while several high-profile WWF stars appeared in the USWA. Dallas wrestler Gentleman Chris Adams spent a few months in the USWA in an angle involving Brian Christopher and Toni Adams, splitting his time between Memphis and Dallas' GWF during this time frame.

Struggling to stay relevant during the "Monday Night Wars"
The wrestling landscape changed in 1995 - the Monday Night Wars began, with WWF and WCW battling for cable television supremacy on Monday nights each and every week. As for the USWA, their biggest crowds came every Monday night at the Mid-South Coliseum in Memphis, Tennessee. With a growing wrestling viewership on Monday nights that could watch pay per view-quality wrestling matches for free on television, the live attendance at the marquee events for the USWA began to dwindle. A move to Thursday nights did not help what was becoming inevitable - the demise of the USWA.

Closure

A combination of a poor line up, sub-standard venue, lack of talent and holding the show on a Thursday night led to a show on October 3, 1996, drawing the smallest crowd in the history of Memphis wrestling: just 372 fans, paying $1,800, to the Big One Flea Market. The future of the promotion was being questioned, following the previous week's resignation of general manager Randy Hales. The Louisville and Nashville crowds had stayed consistent, but the Memphis crowds, which in the past had carried the promotion, had fallen over the past few months. In addition, the Big One (Flea Market) pavilion was less than inviting, the zigzag roof of its original owner (The Treasury Stores) causing its major leaking problem.

Major USWA cities
Memphis, Tennessee
Dallas, Texas
Nashville, Tennessee
Louisville, Kentucky
Evansville, Indiana
Jackson, Tennessee
Jonesboro, Arkansas
Tupelo, Mississippi
Tuckerman, Arkansas
Kennett, Missouri

Championships
USWA Unified World Heavyweight Championship 
USWA World Tag Team Championship
USWA Television Championship
USWA Junior Heavyweight Championship
USWA Middleweight Championship
USWA Texas Heavyweight Championship
USWA Southern Heavyweight Championship
USWA Women's Championship

Alumni

Deceased individuals are indicated with a dagger (†).
Steve Keirn
Stan Lane
Curtis Thompson
Sabu
Sapphire†
Jim Cornette
Rob Van Dam
Lanny Poffo†
Doug Gilbert
Mr. Hughes
Jimmy Hart
Jerry Lawler
Dirty White Boy
King Cobra
The Shadow
King Reginald
Tony Williams
Bill Dundee
Big Business Brown†
Brian Christopher†
The Spellbinder
The Soultaker
Ricky Morton
Robert Gibson
The Rock 'n' Roll Express
Todd Champion
Jeff Jarrett
Master of Pain/The Punisher
Tojo Yamamoto†
Jimmy Valiant
Butch Reed†
Billy Jack Haynes
Cactus Jack Manson
Austin Idol
Dustin Rhodes
Kamala†
Eddie Gilbert†
Koko B. Ware
Junkyard Dog†
"Dr. Death" Steve Williams† 
Doug Basham
Nate the Rat
Man of The 90s
The Spider
The Gravedigger
Sgt. Victor
Rock 'n' Roll Phantom
J. C. Ice
Nightmare Danny Davis
Wolfie D
Flex Kavana
John Tatum
The Dragon Master†
Jeff Gaylord†
Terry Funk
Chris Youngblood†
Mark Youngblood
Dutch Mantel
Sid Vicious
Tom Prichard
Jimmy Del Ray† 
Pat Tanaka
Bart Sawyer
Paul Diamond
Eric Embry
Tommy Rich
Gorgeous George III
Buddy Landel
Chris Bullock
Clyde Coleman
Brian Lee
Brickhouse Brown†
Jesse James Armstrong
Miss Texas
The Harlem Knights
Chris Adams†
Toni Adams†
Scotty Anthony
Robert Fuller
Ron Fuller
Kerry Von Erich†
Kevin Von Erich
Spike Huber
The Hornet
Richard Lee
Freezer Thompson
Bruiser
The Power Twins (Larry and David Power)
The Barroom Brawlers
The Gambler
The Texas Hangmen
Marty Jannetty
The Masters of Terror
Matt Borne†
Eddie Marlin†
The Harris Brothers
Tracy Smothers†
Cody Michaels
Brad Armstrong†
Jerry Lynn
Downtown Bruno
Steve Doll†
Doomsday/Christmas Creature
Jimmy Jack Funk
Billy Travis†
Cowabunga†
The Ninja Turtle (or Cowabunga II)†
Chris Candido†
Steve Austin
Jeanie Clarke
Rod Price
The Snowman†
William G. "Dutch" Nichols
Joey Maggs†
Leatherface†
Flash Flanagan
Candi Devine†
Axl Rotten†
Ian Rotten
Scott Braddock
Tekno Team 2000
Brakkus
Chris Champion†
Reno Riggins
Scott Studd
Terry Gordy†
Rex King†
New Jack†
Pez Whatley†
Johnny Hotbody
Iceman King Parsons
Jack Hammer
Steven Dane†
Chris Walker
The War Machines
The Phantoms
Mr. Clyde
Homeboy 
The King Killer
The Scorpions
Bert Prentice†
The Colorado Kid
Mike Samples
Shawn Venom
Todd Morton
Ric Hogan
Tony Falk
Gary Young
John Paul
"Mean" Mike Miller
Awesome Kong
Jim Florence 
Ronnie P. Gossett†
Keith Eric
Super Mario
Jed Grundy
Angel of Death†
The Sandman
Moondog Fifi†
Moondog Spike†
Moondog Spot†
Moondog Rex†
Moondog Cujo†
Moondog Splat
Big Black Dog
Lauren Davenport
"Dirty White Girl" Kimberly
The American Eagles

Talent exchange wrestlers in USWA
Home promotion in parenthesis

Owen Hart† (WWF)
Bret Hart (WWF)
Mr. Perfect† (WWF)
Razor Ramon† (WWF)
Randy Savage† (WWF)
Papa Shango (WWF)
Kerry Von Erich† (WCCW)
Chris Adams† (GWF and WCCW)
Sensational Sherri† (WWF)
Luna Vachon† (WWF)
Bob Backlund (WWF)
The Big Bossman† (WWF)
The Steiner Brothers (WWF)
Eddie Gilbert† (GWF)
Jim Cornette (SMW)
Jesse James Armstrong (WWF)
Men on a Mission (WWF)
Giant González† (WWF)
The Headshrinkers (WWF)
Tommy Dreamer (ECW)
Psycho Sid Vicious (WWF)
Tatanka (WWF)
Ahmed Johnson (WWF)
Beulah McGillicutty (ECW)
The New Razor Ramon† (WWF)
Vince McMahon (WWF)
Koko B. Ware (WWF)
Hacksaw Jim Duggan (WWF)
Shawn Michaels (WWF)
Sunny (WWF)
Mankind (WWF)
Doink the Clown (WWF)
Big Van Vader† (WCW and WWF)
Lex Luger (WWF)
Harvey Wippleman (WWF)
Isaac Yankem/The New Diesel (WWF)
Sgt. Slaughter  (WWF) 
The Undertaker  (WWF)
The Rock 'n' Roll Express (SMW)
The Godwinns (WWF)
The Bushwhackers (WWF)
The Bodydonnas (WWF)
The Smoking Gunns (WWF)
The Natural Disasters (WWF)
The Orient Express  (WWF)
Adam Bomb (WWF)
Steve Lombardi (WWF)
Howard Finkel† (WWF)
Jimmy Hart (WWF)
Paul Bearer† (WWF)
Barry Horowitz (WWF)
1-2-3 Kid (WWF)
Justin Bradshaw (WWF)
Bam Bam Bigelow† (WWF)
Mark Henry (WWF)

References

External links

Memphis Wrestling History
Regional Territories: USWA
CageMatch.de - United States Wrestling Association 

 
Continental Wrestling Association
Entertainment companies established in 1989
Entertainment companies disestablished in 1997
Independent professional wrestling promotions based in Tennessee
Sports-related mergers
World Class Championship Wrestling